Greece competed at the 2021 European Athletics Indoor Championships in Torun, Poland, between 4 and 7 March 2021 with 19 athletes.

Medals

Results

References

European Athletics Championships
2021